Thomas O'Reilly may refer to:

Tom O'Reilly (Fermanagh politician) (fl.1990s–2000s), Irish politician in Fermanagh and South Tyrone
Tom O'Reilly (Cavan politician) (1915–1995), Gaelic football player from Cavan and independent TD 1944–1948
Thomas O'Reilly (Kerry politician) (died 1944), member of the Dáil, 1927–1933
Thomas O'Reilly (Newfoundland politician) (c. 1839–1897), politician and magistrate in Newfoundland
Thomas O'Reilly (clergyman) (1819–1881), Isle of Man born Anglican minister, active in Australia from the 1840s
Tom O'Reilly (rugby league) (born 1974), Papua New Guinea rugby league international
Thomas Charles O'Reilly (1873–1938), American bishop